Edward Turner (8 August 1858 – 26 January 1893) was an Australian cricketer. He played nine first-class cricket matches for Victoria between 1881 and 1884.

See also
 List of Victoria first-class cricketers

References

External links
 

1858 births
1893 deaths
Australian cricketers
Victoria cricketers